William Henry Bassett (born December 28, 1935 in Evanston, Illinois, USA) is an American actor of film and television. He has appeared in more than 100 films and television programs since the 1960s.

Bassett was known for his role in ads for Whataburger. He has appeared in films such as Lucky Lady, Return from Witch Mountain, The Karate Kid, Black Eagle, House of 1000 Corpses, Demon Hunter and Black Dynamite, as well as such television shows as Bewitched; I Dream of Jeannie; Bonanza; The Feather and Father Gang; The Love Boat; Days of Our Lives; Quincy, M.E.; Lou Grant; Dallas; The Young and the Restless; Newhart; General Hospital; Sabrina The Teenage Witch; 3rd Rock from the Sun; Scrubs; The Streets of San Francisco; and Arrested Development. Bassett's work as a voice actor includes the video games Metal Gear Solid, Warcraft 3: The Frozen Throne, Fallout 3, Star Wars: The Old Republic, Final Fantasy Type-0 HD and World of Final Fantasy, along with being the narrator for the documentary Inside: Dr. Strangelove or How I Learned to Stop Worrying and Love the Bomb.

Filmography

Anime

Film

Television

Video games

References

External links

1935 births
Living people
American male film actors
American male television actors
American male voice actors
Male actors from Evanston, Illinois
20th-century American male actors
21st-century American male actors